Los Ruices is a village in Valencia, Spain. It is part of the municipality of Requena and belongs to the comarca Requena-Utiel.

Towns in Spain
Populated places in the Province of Valencia
Requena-Utiel
Localities of Spain